Illzilla are an Australian hip hop group featuring live instruments. The group mix funk, reggae and rock.

Illzilla released their debut album Wasteland in 2008. They were a Victorian winner of Triple J's Unearthed competition and were nominated for the Unearthed J Award.

Discography
Wasteland (2008) - Shock
Illzilla EP (2005) - Obese

Awards and nominations

J Award
The J Awards are an annual series of Australian music awards that were established by the Australian Broadcasting Corporation's youth-focused radio station Triple J. They commenced in 2005.

|-
| J Awards of 2007
|themselves
| Unearthed Artist of the Year
|

References

External links
Illzilla: Telling us the score interview at inthemix

Victoria (Australia) musical groups